Alboussière is a commune in the Ardèche department in the Auvergne-Rhône-Alpes region of southern France.

The inhabitants of the commune are known as Alboussiérois or Alboussiéroises

Geography
Alboussière is located some 10 km west of Valence and 10 km east of Lamastre. It can be accessed by the winding D533 road from Valence which passes through the village and continues west to Saint-Barthélemy-Grozon. The D14 road from Vernoux-en-Vivarais in the south also passes through the commune to join the D533 just north of the commune. The commune is also covered with a network of small roads. There are nine other hamlets in the commune other than the village. These are: Aubert, Blanc, Les Chatanelles, La Chalaye, Bleizac, Le Mas, Le Vivier, Ponsoye, and Fialaix.

There are numerous streams throughout the commune. The Ruisseau de Jergne forms most of the southern border and the Duzon forms much of the eastern boundary with large numbers of unnamed streams joining them.

Neighbouring communes and villages

Heraldry

Administration

List of Successive Mayors

Population

Distribution of Age Groups
The age distribution of the population of the commune is similar to that of the department.

Percentage Distribution of Age Groups in Alboussière and Ardèche Department in 2017

Source: INSEE

Sites and Monuments
The Chateau Crozat was enlarged in the 17th century then transformed by the architect Louis Achille Tracol in the 19th century.
The Chapel of St-Didier-de-Crussol
The Church of Saint-André-de-Crussol contains a Statue: Saint-Evêque (19th century) which is registered as an historical object.
The Artificial lake

Notable people linked to the commune
Edmond Ponsoye, pastor and historian, from a very old family who owned the hamlet of Ponsoye Alboussiere.
Gerard Miller, psychoanalyst and member of the Ruquier Band, rented with his brother Stéphane a snack-bar at the edge of the Alboussière lake in the summer of 2011.
Louis-Balthazard du Bay was born in the castle on 3  November 1775. He was, among others, Lord of Cros, Baron of Boffre, Mayor of Saint-Péray, and a member of the electoral college of the department of Ardèche.

See also
Communes of the Ardèche department

References

External links

Alboussière on the old National Geographic Institute website 
Alboussière on Géoportail, National Geographic Institute (IGN) website 
Alboigßiers on the 1750 Cassini Map

Communes of Ardèche
Monte Carlo Rally